Sabanayevo (Sabanay) is a rural locality (a selo) in Karansky Selsoviet, Buzdyaksky District, Bashkortostan, Russia. The population was 188 as of 2010. There are 3 streets.

Geography 
Sabanayevo is located 25 km north of Buzdyak (the district's administrative centre) by road. Staroaktau is the nearest rural locality.

References 

Rural localities in Buzdyaksky District